No Cure was a fanzine based in Bracknell and Newbury, UK. Originally started by Richard Haworth, from issue 2 it was part-edited and produced by Richard Griffin and Richard H with regular contributions from Jah P. The fanzine took a major interest in the Berkshire and Oxfordshire punk and post punk scene of the late 1970s and early 1980s and covered punk, Oi! post punk and Reggae. Many interviews were conducted by mailing a cassette and list of questions, which elicited interesting discussions between band members without the problem of an interviewer butting in (see also cassette culture). Bands interviewed ranged from The Jam and Stiff Little Fingers to The Raincoats, VIPs, Patrick Fitzgerald, LKJ and The Instant Automatons. The photographer Pennie Smith was also interviewed. A thousand copies of No Cure were sold each issue through record shops in Reading (Quicksliver), Windsor (Revolution) and London including Rough Trade and mail order. At one point it was the largest selling UK zine in New York City.

As with most fanzines, production techniques were rudimentary. Text was produced using a portable typewriter, pens (most issues had a crossword) and images cut from magazines and elsewhere, along with some original photography by Richard H. Text was glued onto boards and sent to the printers. In total seven issues were produced.

Richard G later teamed up with Chris Green producing two issues of Bits fanzine and X Cassettes which released music from local bands like Quality Drivel, as well as groups from further afield. They were also involved in the promotion and distribution of a Reading area compilation LP Beyond the River released by Open Door records and featuring local bands such as Dig Dig Dig, El Seven, The Ballistics, The Erection Set, St Vitus Dance, Movita, Shrinking Men, A1 Vegetables, The Beating Hearts, Access and The Stills. A single was released by Oxfordshire band Dig Dig Dig. Richard G was also involved with Mike D of Toxic Graffiti (sic) fanzine in establishing the short lived UK Fanzine Collective. Chris G went on to form Criminal Damage Records.

No Cure was the first Berkshire fanzine. It championed local bands such as The Lemon Kittens and the Infra Red Helicopters from Bracknell and the K-9s.

References

Defunct magazines published in the United Kingdom
Mass media in Berkshire
Music magazines published in the United Kingdom
Newbury, Berkshire
Punk zines
Magazines with year of establishment missing
Magazines with year of disestablishment missing